Kingsley Onuegbu (born 5 March 1986) is a Nigerian professional footballer who plays as a striker for Qingdao Hainiu in China League One.

Career
Onuegbu played street football in Nigeria, before his football career began in Germany in the summer of 2005 with SC Idar-Oberstein. In his first professional season for Idar-Oberstein in 2007–08, Onuegbu scored twelve goals in 26 games. In the summer of 2008 he joined Eintracht Braunschweig. On 11 May 2010, he left Braunschweig to sign with SpVgg Greuther Fürth. He signed with MSV Duisburg in 2013. On 9 May 2018, it was announced that he will leave Duisburg at the end of the 2017–18 season.

For the 2018–19 season, he joined Cypriot club Nea Salamis Famagusta.

On 30 August 2020, Onuegbu signed with Chinese club Shaanxi Chang'an Athletics.

Personal life
He was born as Kingsley Ugochuwu and moved with twenty years from Lagos, Nigeria to his father to Paris, France.

References

External links

1986 births
Living people
Sportspeople from Kaduna
Nigerian footballers
Association football forwards
Eintracht Braunschweig players
SpVgg Greuther Fürth players
SV Sandhausen players
Oberliga (football) players
2. Bundesliga players
3. Liga players
MSV Duisburg players
Nea Salamis Famagusta FC players
Shaanxi Chang'an Athletic F.C. players
China League One players
Nigerian expatriate footballers
Nigerian expatriate sportspeople in China
Expatriate footballers in China
Nigerian expatriate sportspeople in Germany
Expatriate footballers in Germany
Nigerian expatriate sportspeople in Cyprus
Expatriate footballers in Cyprus